Fresh, Fried and Crispy is an American food reality television series hosted by American food critic and YouTube personality Daym Drops. It premiered on Netflix on June 9, 2021.

Episodes

Production
Fresh, Fried and Crispy was produced by Ugly Brother Studios. The first season was filmed between July and August 2020. Filming locations included St. Louis; Savannah, Georgia; Las Vegas; Baltimore; San Diego; Denver; Birmingham, Alabama; and Cleveland.

Release
Fresh, Fried and Crispy premiered on Netflix on June 9, 2021.

Reception
Writing for the pop culture website Decider, Joel Keller found the show "just too heavy on shtick to be enjoyable". M. N. Miller of Ready Steady Cut awarded the show 2.5 stars (out of a possible 5), criticizing it for being "reheated entertainment" that "doesn't offer anything new to the genre".

References

External links
 
 

2020s American documentary television series
2021 American television series debuts
English-language Netflix original programming
Netflix original documentary television series